Vishal Sharma (born 14 November 1987) is an Indian first-class cricketer who plays for Hyderabad. He made his Twenty20 debut on 4 January 2016 in the 2015–16 Syed Mushtaq Ali Trophy.

References

1987 births
Living people
Indian cricketers
Hyderabad cricketers
Cricketers from Hyderabad, India